Tom Selvik (born 16 May 1970) is a Norwegian sprint canoer who competed in the mid-1990s.

He was eliminated in the semifinals of the K-4 1000 m event at the 1996 Summer Olympics in Atlanta. He represented the Bergen-based club Njård RKK and has been the head coach in Oslo KK.

References

1970 births
Living people
Norwegian male canoeists
Canoeists at the 1996 Summer Olympics
Olympic canoeists of Norway
Norwegian sports coaches